Contra may refer to:

Places 
 Contra, Virginia
 Contra Costa Canal, an aqueduct in the U.S. state of California
 Contra Costa County, California
 Tenero-Contra, a municipality in the district of Locarno in the canton of Ticino in Switzerland

People
 Cosmin Contra (born 1975), Romanian football player
 Contra (writer) (real name Margus Konnula; born 1974), Estonian poet and translator
 Contra (rapper) (real name Çağdaş Terzi; born 1989), Turkish rapper and songwriter

Arts, entertainment, and media

Games 
 Contra (card game), an historical German card game also known as Kontraspiel
 Contra (cards), a bid to double the stakes in many card games
 Contra (series), a line of run and gun video games created by Konami
 Contra (video game), the original game, released in 1987

Music and dance 
 Contra (album), the second album by Vampire Weekend
 Contra (band), a band from Cleveland
 "Contra" (song), a song by Logic
 Contra dance, several folk dance styles in which couples dance in two facing lines of indefinite length

Law and politics
 Contra (citation signal), a term used in legal citations
 Contra account, or contra amount
 Contras, Nicaraguan counter-revolutionaries opposed to the Sandinistas
 Iran–Contra affair, the Reagan administration selling weapons to Iran to fund the Contras

Musical instruments
 Contra-alto clarinet 
 Contrabass bugle, the lowest-pitched instrument in the drum and bugle corps hornline
 Contrabass clarinet
 Contrabass saxophone
 Contrabassoon, or double bassoon, a larger version of the bassoon sounding an octave lower
 Subcontrabass saxophone